Anselm (died 1148) was a medieval bishop of London whose election was quashed by Pope Innocent II. He was a monk of Chiusa, abbot of Saint Saba in Rome, papal legate to England, and abbot of Bury St Edmunds.

Biography

Anselm was the son of a nobleman named Burgundius and his wife Richeza or Richera, the much younger sister of Anselm, archbishop of Canterbury. Anselm was dedicated to a clerical life from a young age despite all his siblings having died in birth or in childhood. He joined the Benedictine abbey of Saint Michael's on Mount Pirchiriano overlooking Chiusa in the March of Susa. Anselm visited the abbey with his chaplain and biographer Eadmer during Easter in 1098 and brought the young man with them to Lyons, where he suffered but recovered from a grave illness. His father Burgundius seems to have wanted to profit from his brother-in-law's high position but St Anselm "warned him off in no uncertain terms" and he instead took the cross, journeying as a pilgrim or warrior to the Holy Land amid the ongoing First Crusade. He then died or never returned, leaving Anselm's uncle to provide for the family. St Anselm watched over his nephew's ecclesiastical career from afar and sent him some letters of guidance, but his attempt to enroll his sister in the Cluniac nunnery at Marcigny was successfully blocked by his nephew's abbot at Chiusa, presumably because he did not want to endanger his own abbey's inheritance of the family's remaining estates.

After his uncle's death, Anselm was elected abbot of Saint Saba monastery in Rome. He served as papal legate to England twice between 1115 and 1119. In 1121, he was elected abbot of Bury St Edmunds. He was elected to the see of London about 22 March 1136 and was enthroned in 1137, but his election was quashed by Pope Innocent II in 1138. He then returned to Bury St Edmunds. Despite noting Anselm's importance in establishing the Feast of the Immaculate Conception, Southern was of the opinion that the young Anselm "was not a very bright young man" and owed his position "entirely to the fame of his uncle".

Anselm died on 3 January 1148.

Legacy
Anselm wanted to make the pilgrimage to Santiago de Compostela but was talked out of the trip by his monks. Instead, he had a church to St James built in the abbey, which may have been the first such church in England.

Notes

Citations

References

 .  & 
 
 .
 .
 
 .
 .

Bishops of London
1148 deaths
Abbots of San Saba
Abbots of Bury St. Edmunds
Year of birth unknown
12th-century English Roman Catholic bishops
12th century in London